Sir Simon David Jenkins  (born 10 June 1943) is a British author, a newspaper columnist and editor. He was editor of the Evening Standard from 1976 to 1978 and of The Times from 1990 to 1992.

Jenkins chaired the National Trust from 2008 to 2014. He currently writes columns for The Guardian.

Early life
Jenkins was born , in Birmingham, England. His father, Daniel Thomas Jenkins, was a Welsh professor of divinity at Princeton University and a Minister in the Congregational and then United Reformed Church. He was educated at Mill Hill School and St John's College, Oxford, where he earned a degree in Philosophy, Politics and Economics.

Career

Journalism
After graduating from the University of Oxford, Jenkins initially worked at Country Life magazine, before joining the Times Educational Supplement. He was then features editor and columnist on the Evening Standard before editing the Insight pages of The Sunday Times. From 1976 to 1978 he was editor of the Evening Standard, before becoming political editor of  The Economist from 1979 to 1986. He edited The Times from 1990 to 1992, and since then has been a columnist for The Times and The Guardian. In 1998 he received the What the Papers Say Journalist of the Year award.

In January 2005, he announced he was ending his 15-year association with The Times to write a book, before joining The Guardian as a columnist. He retained a column at The Sunday Times and was a contributing blogger at The Huffington Post. He gave up both on becoming chairman of the National Trust in 2008, when he also resumed an occasional column for the Evening Standard.

Opinions
In April 2009, The Guardian withdrew one of Jenkins' articles from its website after African National Congress leader and South African president-elect Jacob Zuma sued the paper for defamation. The Guardian issued an apology, and settled the libel case for an undisclosed sum.

In February 2010, Jenkins argued in a Guardian article that British control over the Falkland Islands was an "expensive legacy of empire" and should be handed over to the Argentinian government. He argued that they could be leased back under the supervision of the United Nations and that the 2,500 or so Falkland Islanders should not have "an unqualified veto on British government policy".

In a piece in The Guardian in June 2010 he wrote that the government should "cut [defence], all £45 billion of it. ... With the end of the Cold War in the 1990s that threat [of global communism] vanished." In August 2016 he wrote in The Guardian in support of NATO membership, saying: "It is a real deterrent, and its plausibility rests on the assurance of collective response".

Jenkins voted for the UK to Remain within the European Union in the 2016 United Kingdom European Union membership referendum, arguing in The Guardian that leaving would provide Germany with dominance over the remainder of the union: "It would leave Germany effectively alone at the head of Europe, alternately hesitant and bullying".

Jenkins wrote in The Guardian that Rishi Sunak's aids as Prime Minister were "young, sneakered, tieless image-makers, and fiercely loyal to him."  They were "special advisers, thinktanks and lobby groups isolated from the world outside."

Books
Jenkins has written several books on the politics, history and architecture of England, including England's Thousand Best Churches and England's Thousand Best Houses. In his 2011 book A Short History of England, he argued that the British Empire "was a remarkable institution that dismantled itself in good order".

In 2022, Jenkins' book,The Celts: A Sceptical History, stoked some controversy on account of Jenkins incredulous view of the Celts as a distinct cultural entity. The release of the work was met with a number of hostile reviews, with critics of the book citing factual errors in the work as well as of the misrepresentation of some sources,  however, other reviews were more supportive of Jenkins.

Public appointments
Jenkins served on the boards of British Rail 1979–1990 and London Transport 1984–1986. He was a member of the Millennium Commission from February 1994 to December 2000, and has also sat on the Board of Trustees of The Architecture Foundation. From 1985 to 1990, he was deputy chairman of English Heritage.

In July 2008, it was announced that he had been chosen as the new chairman of the National Trust; he took over the three-year post from William Proby in November of that year. He remained in the post until November 2014.

Personal life and honours

Jenkins married the American actress Gayle Hunnicutt in 1978; the couple had one son. They separated in 2008 and divorced in 2009. He married Hannah Kaye, events producer at Intelligence Squared, in 2014.

Jenkins was appointed a Knight Bachelor for services to journalism in the 2004 New Year Honours.

Selected works
Simon Jenkins (1969) Education and Labour's Axe, Bow Publications, 
Simon Jenkins (1971) Here to Live: Study of Race Relations in an English Town, Runnymede Trust, 
Simon Jenkins (1975) Landlords to London: Story of a Capital and Its Growth, Constable, 
Simon Jenkins (1979) Newspapers: The Power and the Money, Faber, 
Simon Jenkins (1981) Newspapers Through the Looking-glass, Manchester Statistical Society, 
Simon Jenkins and Andrew Graham-Yooll (1983) Imperial Skirmishes: War And Gunboat Diplomacy In Latin America, Diane Publishing, 
Sir Max Hastings and Simon Jenkins (1984) Battle for the Falklands, M Joseph, 
Simon Jenkins and Anne Sloman (1985) With Respect, Ambassador: Enquiry into the Foreign Office, BBC, 
Simon Jenkins (1986) The Market for Glory: Fleet Street Ownership in the Twentieth Century, Faber and Faber, 
Simon Jenkins and Robert Ilson (1992) "The Times" English Style and Usage Guide, Times Books, 
Simon Jenkins (1993) The Selling of Mary Davies and Other Writings, John Murray, 
Simon Jenkins (1994) Against the Grain, John Murray, 
Simon Jenkins (1995) Accountable to None: Tory Nationalization of Britain, Hamish Hamilton, 
Simon Jenkins (1999) England's Thousand Best Churches, Allen Lane, 
Simon Jenkins (2003) England's Thousand Best Houses, Allen Lane, 
Simon Jenkins (2006) Thatcher & Sons – A Revolution in Three Acts, Penguin, 
Simon Jenkins (2008) Wales: Churches, Houses, Castles, Allen Lane, 
Simon Jenkins (2011) A Short History of England, Profile Books, 
Simon Jenkins (2013) England's Hundred Best Views, Profile Books, 
Simon Jenkins (2016), England's Cathedrals, Little Brown, 
Simon Jenkins (2017) Britain's Hundred Best Railway Stations, Penguin Books, 
Simon Jenkins (2018) A Short History of Europe: From Pericles to Putin, Penguin Books, 
Simon Jenkins (2022) Cathedrals: Masterpieces of Architecture, Feats of Engineering, Icons of Faith, Rizzoli, 
Simon Jenkins (2022) The Celts: A Sceptical History, Profile Books,

References

External links
Simon Jenkins columns at The Guardian
Simon Jenkins columns at The Huffington Post
Simon Jenkins columns at the London Evening Standard
Simon Jenkins columns at The Spectator

Debrett's People of Today

1943 births
Living people
Alumni of St John's College, Oxford
British male bloggers
British Rail people
British writers
English bloggers
English male journalists
English newspaper editors
Fellows of the Royal Society of Literature
Fellows of St John's College, Oxford
Fellows of the Society of Antiquaries of London
The Guardian journalists
HuffPost writers and columnists
Knights Bachelor
London Evening Standard people
Members of the Bow Group
National Trust people
People associated with the University of Wales, Lampeter
People educated at City of Bath Boys' School
People educated at Mill Hill School
The Sunday Times people
The Times people
Writers from Birmingham, West Midlands